Nereida Bauta (born 14 July 1950) is a Cuban gymnast. She competed in six events at the 1968 Summer Olympics.

References

External links
 

1950 births
Living people
Cuban female artistic gymnasts
Olympic gymnasts of Cuba
Gymnasts at the 1968 Summer Olympics
Sportspeople from Havana
20th-century Cuban women
20th-century Cuban people
21st-century Cuban women